The 1995 Wellington local elections were part of the 1995 New Zealand local elections, to elect members to sub-national councils and boards. The Wellington elections cover one regional council (the Greater Wellington Regional Council), eight territorial authority (city and district) councils, three district health boards, and various community boards and licensing trusts. The polling was conducted using the standard first-past-the-post electoral method.

Wellington City Council
The Wellington City Council consists of a mayor and eighteen councillors elected from five wards (Northern, Western, Tawa, Eastern, Southern).

Mayor

Eastern Ward
The Eastern Ward returns four councillors to the Wellington City Council. The final results for the ward were:

Northern Ward
The Northern Ward returns four councillors to the Wellington City Council. The final results for the ward were:

 

 
 

 

Table footnotes:

Southern Ward
The Southern Ward returns four councillors to the Wellington City Council. The final results for the ward were:

Tawa Ward
The Tawa Ward returns two councillors to the Wellington City Council. The final results for the ward were:

Western Ward
The Western Ward returns four councillors to the Wellington City Council. The final results for the ward were:

Wellington Regional Council

North Ward
The North Ward returns two councillors to the Wellington Regional Council.

South Ward
The South Ward returns three councillors to the Wellington Regional Council.

References

Wellington
Politics of the Wellington Region
Wellington
1990s in Wellington